Cultural Foundation may refer to:

Abu Dhabi Cultural Foundation
America Israel Cultural Foundation
Cayman National Cultural Foundation
Ema Gordon Klabin Cultural Foundation
European Cultural Foundation
Grace Communion International
Kumho Cultural Foundation
National Bank of Greece Cultural Foundation
National Cultural Foundation
Rich Mix Cultural Foundation
Romanian Cultural Foundation
Tribal Research and Cultural Foundation
Turkish Cultural Foundation